Lesholal Gomasta was an Indian politician from the state of the Madhya Pradesh. He represented Balod Vidhan Sabha constituency of undivided Madhya Pradesh Legislative Assembly by winning General election of 1957.

References 

Year of birth missing
Possibly living people
People from Madhya Pradesh
Madhya Pradesh MLAs 1957–1962
People from Balod district
Indian National Congress politicians from Madhya Pradesh